The Chinese high-fin banded shark  (Myxocyprinus asiaticus) is a popular freshwater aquarium fish that belongs to the family Catostomidae.

In addition to Chinese high-fin banded shark, it is also known under many other common names, including Chinese banded shark, Chinese sailfin sucker, high-fin (also spelled hi-fin) banded loach, high-fin loach, Chinese high-fin sucker, sailfin sucker, topsail sucker, Asian sucker, Chinese sucker, wimple carp, wimple, freshwater batfish, Hilsa herring, rough fish, Chinese or Asian zebra high-fin shark, Chinese or Asian zebra high-fin sucker, Chinese emperor, Siamese sucker, Chinese banded shark, and Entsuyui in Japanese. Despite its common names, it bears no relation to real sharks.

It has declined drastically due to pollution, dams (preventing its natural breeding migration), overfishing, introduced species and collection for the aquarium trade.  As a consequence it has been placed on the Chinese list of endangered species and is a state protected species.

Description

Young Chinese high-fin banded sharks normally possess brown bodies bearing three dark-colored slanting bands. During the breeding season, adult males are distinguished from adult females by their red coloration.  Adult females are of dark purple color with a broad and vertical reddish area along the body. Juveniles of the Chinese high-fin banded sharks are also characterized by high and triangular dorsal finnage that extends up to the rear of the anal fin. The adult appearance is far less distinctive, as they are elongated in shape without the very high dorsal fin. The thick and fleshy lips bear small papillae without barbels.  They have a single row of pharyngeal teeth that have comb-like arrangements.

Through adulthood, Chinese high-fin banded sharks become darker in appearance.

Distribution and habitat
Chinese high-fin banded sharks are native to the Yangtze River basin of China. They migrate into relatively fast flowing, shallow headwaters to spawn, but spend the remaining time in the main river sections. The population in the Min River, a tributary of the Yangtze, may have been extirpated.

The species is widely cultured in China to supply the food industry.

Life span
In its natural habitat, Chinese high-fin banded sharks live for more than 25 years and reaches sexual maturity when 5 to 6 years old.

See also
 List of endangered and protected species of China

References

External links

 Myxocyprinus asiaticus (Bleeker, 1865), Taxonomic Serial No.: 639710, Taxonomy, ITIS.gov, retrieved on: August 21, 2007
 Photograph of the Chinese high-fin banded shark at Mongabay.com

Catostomidae
Endemic fauna of China
Freshwater fish of China
Yangtze River
Endangered fish
Endangered fauna of Asia
Fish described in 1865

Species endangered by damming
Species endangered by pollution
Endangered Fauna of China